College Coach (UK title Football Coach) is a 1933 American pre-Code drama film starring Dick Powell and Ann Dvorak. The film features John Wayne in his last bit-part role.

Plot
Calvert College begins taking football more seriously, over the objections of Dr. Sargeant, the president of the school. Coach Gore is brought in and given a free rein, which he uses to pay money to standout players. He is so obsessed with winning that he ignores his wife, Claire.

The president's son, Phil Sargeant, is also an outstanding athlete, but is far more interested in studying chemistry. He is persuaded to join the team, however, and becomes the fourth of the "Four Aces" who begin leading Calvert to victories.

Football stars begin feeling entitled to things, including favoritism in the classroom. One of them, Weaver, even makes a pass at the coach's wife. Phil Sargeant is offended when given a passing grade for a chemistry test he didn't even complete. He quarrels with the coach and quits the team.

Gore catches his wife having dinner with a player and kicks Weaver off the squad. Soon the team is losing games and funds, which even threatens the future of the science department. Phil decides to play again for that reason, and Claire explains to her husband that the dinner was innocent. Weaver is reinstated as well, Calvert wins the big game and the coach offers to quit, but is given a second chance by his wife and the college.

Cast

Dick Powell as Phil Sargeant
Ann Dvorak as Claire Gore
Pat O'Brien as Coach James Gore
Arthur Byron as Dr. Phillip Sargeant
Lyle Talbot as Buck Weaver
Hugh Herbert as Barnett
Arthur Hohl as Seymour Young
Charles C. Wilson as Hauser
Guinn Williams as Matthews
Nat Pendleton as Petrowski
Phillip Reed as "Wes" Westerman, student who flunks the chemistry exam
Donald Meek as Professor Trask, chemistry instructor
Berton Churchill as Otis, chairman of the college's board of directors
Harry Beresford as Faculty advisor who helps students in choice of major
Herman Bing as German-accented professor who tries to tutor Buck Weaver
Joe Sauers as Holcomb, football player assigned to botany
John Wayne (uncredited cameo appearance)
Ward Bond (uncredited cameo appearance)

John Wayne's unbilled cameo role 
At Dick Powell's initial appearance (11:40 into the film), he is standing in line at the college bursar's office, when a fellow student (seen only from the back) approaches and greets him, "Hello, Phil, how does it feel to be back?" "Great, great", replies Powell, "have a good vacation?" "Yes, s'long", answers the student and quickly walks forward, joining other students. A voice is heard, "Hi, boy". "Hi, Kim", replies Powell to an unseen student and, immediately spotting someone else, extends both arms and says enthusiastically, "Well, if it isn't the old boy, himself!". The camera moves to the left, as John Wayne comes into view, extending his hand to shake Powell's and saying, "Hear you broke the rules, Phil — studied during vacation." "Huh-huh", answers Powell, "don't give me away. See you later, huh?" "You bet", says Wayne, turning left and out of camera frame. Later (15:10 into the film, followed by other scenes), in the brief role of assistant coach to Pat O'Brien's title character, is another unbilled player — Ward Bond — who, between 1929 and 1959, appeared with Wayne in 24 films.

See also
 John Wayne filmography

References

External links

College Coach at TV Guide (shortened and revised version of 1987 write-up originally published in The Motion Picture Guide)

1933 drama films
1933 films
American football films
American black-and-white films
Films directed by William A. Wellman
Warner Bros. films
1930s English-language films
Films set in universities and colleges
American drama films
1930s American films
Films scored by Bernhard Kaun